Meirzhan Shermakhanbet is a Kazakhstani Greco-Roman wrestler. He is a bronze medalist at the World Wrestling Championships and a two-time medalist, including gold, at the Asian Wrestling Championships.

Career 

In 2018, he won one of the bronze medals in the 67 kg event at the World Wrestling Championships held in Budapest, Hungary.

In 2019, he won the silver medal in the 67 kg event at the Asian Wrestling Championships held in Xi'an, China. In 2021, he won the gold medal in the 67 kg event at the Matteo Pellicone Ranking Series 2021 held in Rome, Italy. A month later, he competed at the Asian Olympic Qualification Tournament hoping to qualify for the 2020 Summer Olympics in Tokyo, Japan.

In 2022, he won one of the bronze medals in his event at the Vehbi Emre & Hamit Kaplan Tournament held in Istanbul, Turkey. He won the gold medal in his event at the 2022 Asian Wrestling Championships held in Ulaanbaatar, Mongolia.

Major results

References

External links 
 

Living people
Place of birth missing (living people)
Kazakhstani male sport wrestlers
World Wrestling Championships medalists
Asian Wrestling Championships medalists
21st-century Kazakhstani people
1996 births